Metro is a glossy lifestyle magazine published in New Zealand. It has a strong focus on the city of Auckland, with reportage of issues and society. It has been published monthly, then bimonthly and now quarterly. The magazine was first published independently by Mick Mason, Clive Curry and Bruce Palmer. Bauer Media Group ceased publication of Metro in April 2020 because of the effect of the COVID-19 pandemic. On 17 July 2020, Metro was acquired by the independent publisher Simon Chesterman.

History
Metro was established in 1981. The debut of the magazine coincided with the rapid expansion of the New Zealand economy that occurred from 1984, following the election of the Fourth Labour Government, which implemented widespread neoliberal deregulation and economic reform. The increased access to imported luxury goods made Metro magazine an attractive media environment for advertisers.

From Metros ninth issue in March 1982 until 2002, the magazine featured an influential gossip column called Felicity Ferret. The writer was anonymous, although in May 2006 Auckland restaurant owner Fran Fisher told Metro that she had pitched the idea to editor Warwick Roger in 1982, and had contributed to it – along with Roger – until she left New Zealand in December 1983. The Ferret's initials hinted at her own name. While multiple writers were known to have written for the column over the years, after 1983 the Ferret was suspected to be largely the work of a former model and notorious Auckland socialite, Judith Baragwanath.

Metro magazine's success led to the launch of a sister title, North and South, edited by Robyn Langwell. This publication took a wider look at New Zealand regional stories. Langwell was editor of North & South until June 2007. A third title, the women's interest magazine More, was launched before the stable was bought by ACP Media, an Australian publishing consortium.

Both Metro and North & South have won awards for publishing and journalism and Metro, in particular, has been well known for its standard of photography and design under its art directors William Chen and Jenny Nicholls. This tradition is still strong, with Metro winning Best Art Director (Charlie McKay) at the 2010 Qantas Media Awards.

ACP Media was the owner of Metro until 2013 when the magazine was acquired by Bauer Media Group.

Metro'''s fortunes have varied since Warwick Roger gave up the editor's chair. The appointment of Bill Ralston saw dramatic shifts in the magazine's editorial focus away from the rigor of Roger's style to a more flamboyant, celebrity style format. Sales were disappointing and a period of decline followed.

The magazine was relaunched as a large format glossy title while led by Nicola Legat, a long-time contributing journalist. The changes were intended to reverse the decline of sales and readership. At its peak, Metro sold 40,000 copies, but this had fallen to less than 20,000. During this period the society scandal column Felicity Ferret was dropped from Metros pages. The Ferret briefly returned to the pages of Metro in 2009.

In 2005, Legat left the magazine to join publishing company Random House. She was replaced by Lauren Quaintance, a former North and South writer, who oversaw a 5 per cent increase in circulation. Quaintance left in June 2007 to return to the Sydney Morning Herald and the long-serving deputy Bevan Rapson was appointed acting editor.

A makeover in 2009 saw Metro changed to a smaller size, and the incorporation of Citymix magazine within its pages.

In mid-2010, Rapson was replaced as editor by Simon Wilson, a Metro senior writer and former editor of Cuisine and Consumer, the magazine published by the Consumers' Institute of New Zealand. In 2010, Wilson oversaw a 25 per cent increase in Metro's readership, according to Nielsen Media Research. In August 2015 Susannah Walker became the editor of the magazine, replacing Simon Wilson in the post.

In early April 2020, the Bauer Media Group closed down Metro and several of its New Zealand operations in response to the economic effects of the COVID-19 pandemic in New Zealand. On 17 June 2020, Sydney investment firm Mercury Capital purchased Metro as part of its acquisition of Bauer Media's New Zealand and Australian media assets. On 17 July, Mercury Capital confirmed that it would be selling Metro to the independent publisher Simon Chesterman.

AwardsMetro'' won a number of 2010 Qantas Media Awards: 
 Best Magazine Feature Writer: Simon Wilson
 Best Magazine Designer: Charlie McKay
 Senior Magazine Feature Writer (Politics):Simon Wilson
 Senior Magazine Feature Writer (Arts & Entertainment): Simon Wilson

References

External links

1981 establishments in New Zealand
Lifestyle magazines
Local interest magazines
Magazines established in 1981
Mass media in Auckland
Magazines published in New Zealand
Monthly magazines published in New Zealand